Mebbin  is a national park located in New South Wales, Australia,  north of Sydney.  It is part of the Shield Volcano Group of the World Heritage Site Gondwana Rainforests of Australia inscribed in 1983 and added to the Australian National Heritage List in 2007.  It is also part of the Scenic Rim Important Bird Area, identified as such by BirdLife International because of its importance in the conservation of several species of threatened birds.

This is a paradise for nature lovers, a great place for hiking, picnicking, camping, cycling or horseback riding.

See also
 Protected areas of New South Wales
 High Conservation Value Old Growth forest

References

National parks of New South Wales
Protected areas established in 1999
Gondwana Rainforests of Australia
1999 establishments in Australia
Important Bird Areas of New South Wales